The 2nd Eishockey-Bundesliga was the second tier of Ice hockey in Germany until 2012/13 and has since been replaced by DEL2. Starting in 2002, the league was organized by the ESBG (:de:Eishockeyspielbetriebsgesellschaft mbH), to which the league organization was outsourced from the DEB, the German ice hockey federation. In the 2012–13 season, it featured 13 teams.

History of the 2nd Ice Hockey Bundesliga 
The league was first introduced in the 1973–74 season as the second tier of German ice hockey, the level below the Ice hockey Bundesliga.

History up until 1994 
 From 1973–74 to 1980–81 the league operated as the single-conference 2nd Bundesliga
 In the 1981–82 season, it was divided into two conferences: 2nd Bundesliga Süd (southern division) and 2nd Bundesliga Nord (northern division)
 For the 1982–83 season, it returned to a single-conference league due to a lack of clubs interested in playing in the league
 Starting from the 1983–84 season until 1991–92, it was divided into the 2nd Bundesliga Süd and Nord again, with the top four clubs from each league meeting the bottom two Bundesliga clubs for a promotion round for two places in the Bundesliga
 In the seasons 1992–93 and 1993–94, the league operated as one single division again

From 1994 
The large number of insolvencies of second division clubs in 1994 was the reason for the abolition of the 2nd Bundesliga and the introduction of the Deutsche Eishockey Liga with 18 teams, without promotion and relegation. A number of top clubs from the second division were admitted to the DEL.

Below the former 2nd Bundesliga, the Oberliga now became the highest league still under control of the DEB. The Oberliga was however renamed 1st Liga for the next couple of seasons, until returning to its old name.

From 1998 
As the highest single-division for the DEB, a new league was formed in 1998, receiving the name "Bundesliga". The decision to name the new league "Bundesliga" led to conflicts between the Deutschen Eishockey-Bund and the Deutsche Eishockey Liga, since the DEL was of the opinion that it owned the right to call itself Bundesliga, being the highest league in the country. For this reason, the DEL logo also carries the name 1st Bundesliga in smaller letters below. Eventually, a compromise was reached, naming the new league 2nd Bundesliga instead.

From 1999 
Since 1999, the league became the 2nd Bundesliga again, which is organized today by the Eishockeyspielbetriebsgesellschaft (ESBG). As in the DEL, the clubs must undergo a strict financial examination.

Despite this fact, some clubs still found themselves in financial difficulties throughout the season and had to withdraw, like the EC Bad Nauheim in the past. The Moskitos Essen and Eisbären Regensburg both declared insolvency on 15 April 2008, being unable to meet their debts. Both clubs were immediately relegated from the 2nd Bundesliga. Due to the structure of the 2nd Bundesliga, where all teams playing are separate companies operated by the mother club, the insolvency of one of those does not mean the club itself becomes insolvent.

In the 2008–09 season, the Tölzer Löwen had to declare insolvency and, despite coming second in the league, were relegated. Because the Füchse Duisburg had to return their DEL licence, the champion of the 2nd Bundesliga has the option of promotion to the DEL this season.

Promotion and relegation
In November 2007, the DEL has introduced promotion to the league once more. The teams placed 15th and 16th in the DEL will play a best-of-seven series to determine which club faces the 2nd Bundesliga champion for a place in the league. There is however an ongoing dispute about those games as second division clubs can only have five foreign players on contract and therefore face a handicap in comparison to the DEL clubs with currently twelve. For now, the ESBG has declared that no club from the 2nd Bundesliga would take part in these matches and therefore no promotion/relegation with the DEL will take place.

The two bottom teams in the 2nd Bundesliga are relegated to the Oberliga and the top-two Oberliga teams promoted to this league.

League champions 

 * The Team promoted into the Eishockey-Bundesliga

 * The Team promoted into the Eishockey-Bundesliga

 1 denotes Bundesliga club taking part in the promotion round
 * denotes Team promoted into the Eishockey-Bundesliga

2nd Bundesliga standings

 1 The team finished the regular season but due to having to declare insolvency they were relegated to the last place in the standings.
 2 Team withdrew from the league because of financial reasons.
 3 The Hamburg Crocodiles withdrew to the Oberliga after the 1999–2000 season.
 4 The team was outclosed from the league.
 5 The team leaves the league, when the licence was sold by the owner.
 6 The team declared insolvency but finished the insolvency before the next season.
 7 The club, which organized the team, collapsed for financial reasons.

See also
 Deutsche Eishockey Liga, the DEL
 Ice hockey Bundesliga
 DEL2
 Oberliga
 Regionalliga
 Bavarian ice hockey leagues

References

External links
 Hockey Archives – International ice hockey website with tables and results (in French)
 Official website of the ESBG for the 2nd Bundesliga and Oberliga

 
2
Sports leagues established in 1973
1973 establishments in West Germany
Sports leagues disestablished in 2013
2013 disestablishments in Germany
Germany